Walter Louis Millies (October 18, 1906 – February 28, 1995) was an American professional baseball player, scout and manager whose career began in 1927 and extended into the 1970s. During World War II, he served in the United States Navy.

Millies appeared in 246 games in Major League Baseball over all or parts of six seasons (1934; 1936–1937; 1939–1941) for the Brooklyn Dodgers, Washington Senators and Philadelphia Phillies. He compiled a .243 career batting average with 158 hits, including 20 doubles and three triples, with 65 runs batted in. He started 58 games as the Senators' backup catcher, playing behind left-handed-hitting Cliff Bolton.

Millies had a long career as a minor league manager following his big-league playing career, including a stint as the skipper of the Kinston Eagles of the Coastal Plain League. Then he was a scout for the New York Mets, Houston Astros and Montreal Expos, based in Oak Lawn, Illinois. 

He died in Oak Lawn at the age of 88.

References

1906 births
1995 deaths
United States Navy personnel of World War II
Baseball players from Chicago
Brooklyn Dodgers players
Burlington Bees players
Chattanooga Lookouts managers
Chattanooga Lookouts players
Dayton Ducks players
Dover Orioles players
Dubuque Tigers players
Houston Astros scouts
Louisville Colonels (minor league) players
Madison Blues players
Major League Baseball catchers
Marshalltown Ansons players
Milford Red Sox players
Moline Plowboys players
Montreal Expos scouts
New York Mets scouts
Ottumwa Packers players
People from Oak Lawn, Illinois
Philadelphia Phillies players
Rock Island Islanders players
St. Joseph Saints players
Sportspeople from Chicago
Washington Senators (1901–1960) players
Waterloo Hawks (baseball) players
Wilmington Blue Rocks players
Roswell Pirates players